The D. McDonald House is a historic house at 800 South Broadway in Smackover, Arkansas.  The two-story brick house was built in 1928-29 by DeKalb McDonald, during the oil boom that hit Union County in the 1920s.  It is one of the more unusual houses in the town, exhibiting Craftsman styling with a Mediterranean flair.  The house has irregular massing, with a main block and a number of projecting porches and ells.  The main block and projections generally have hipped roofs finished in red tile with significant overhangs.  The western elevation includes a porte cochere.  Significant original period detailing remains on the interior of the house, despite the application of paneling to the walls.

The house was listed on the National Register of Historic Places in 1990.

See also
National Register of Historic Places listings in Union County, Arkansas

References

Houses on the National Register of Historic Places in Arkansas
Houses in Union County, Arkansas
National Register of Historic Places in Union County, Arkansas
1929 establishments in Arkansas
Houses completed in 1929
American Craftsman architecture in Arkansas
Mediterranean Revival architecture in Arkansas
Smackover, Arkansas